Walisongo State Islamic University (UIN Walisongo) is a public university in Indonesia. It is also called Universitas Islam Negeri (UIN) Walisongo Semarang and located in Semarang, Central Java, Indonesia.

Faculty

Facilities 

 Wifi
 E-Journal
 Education Laboratory
 Science and Mathematics Laboratory  
 Language Laboratory
 Da'wa Laboratory
 Psychotherapy laboratory
 Falak laboratory
 Law Laboratory
 Sports and Art facility
 Library
 Wisma Walisongo
 Ma'had Walisongo
 America Corner

References

External links
  

Buildings and structures in Semarang
Seminaries and theological colleges in Indonesia
Universities in Central Java
Education in Central Java
Islamic universities and colleges in Indonesia
Indonesian state universities